Pierre Bousmanne (born 11 April 1925) was a Belgian field hockey player. He competed in the men's tournament at the 1952 Summer Olympics.

References

External links
 

1925 births
Possibly living people
Belgian male field hockey players
Olympic field hockey players of Belgium
Field hockey players at the 1952 Summer Olympics
Field hockey players from Brussels